Sergente Romolo Ticconi was a World War I flying ace credited with six aerial victories.

Biography
Romolo Ticconi was born in Acuto, the Kingdom of Italy, on 25 March 1893. Ticconi was conscripted into military service on 21 August 1914, before Italy had entered World War I. On 16 December 1916, he was promoted to Caporal. On 20 September 1917, he was reported at the Italian aviation replacement depot as a Sergeant Pilot.

On 27 January 1918, Ticconi joined a fighter squadron, 76a Squadriglia. He scored his first aerial victory on 3 May 1918, when he helped shoot down an enemy two-seater craft. On 24 May, he suffered an inflight fire in his cockpit that burned his right leg; it was one of three flying accidents he would survive during the war. On 25 June 1918, Ticconi and his squadronmates Giulio Lega and Silvio Scaroni vanquished two enemy fighters over Moreno di Piave for Ticconi's second and third victories.

On 7 July, Ticconi shared in one of Silvio Scaroni's victories, but was not credited with another other one. Also in July, he received the Silver Medal for Military Valor to add to his Croce di Guerra; by this time, he had flown 111 hours on 74 combat sorties for the squadron. Ticconi would strike twice more. On 14 August 1918, backed by Giorgio Michetti, he downed his fifth foe and became an ace. The next day, he shot down another enemy plane, for his final victory. Ticconi would fight through war's end, continuing to fly despite illness.

On 21 November 1918, in the wake of war's end, Ticconi transferred to 81a Squadriglia. His perseverance in flying while ill helped him win a belated award of the Bronze Medal for Military Valor. On 26 August 1919, Romolo Ticconi was killed in a flying accident at Montecelio.

Notes

References
 Franks, Norman; Guest, Russell; Alegi, Gregory.  Above the War Fronts: The British Two-seater Bomber Pilot and Observer Aces, the British Two-seater Fighter Observer Aces, and the Belgian, Italian, Austro-Hungarian and Russian Fighter Aces, 1914–1918: Volume 4 of Fighting Airmen of WWI Series: Volume 4 of Air Aces of WWI. Grub Street, 1997. , .

See also
 Medal of Military Valor
 Italian Air Force

Recipients of the Bronze Medal of Military Valor
1893 births
1919 deaths
Italian World War I flying aces